The 1980 World Field Archery Championships were held in Palmerston North, New Zealand.

Medal summary (Men's individual)

Medal summary (Women's individual)

Medal summary (team events)
No team event held at this championships.

References

E
1980 in New Zealand sport
International sports competitions hosted by New Zealand 
Archery competitions in New Zealand
World Field Archery Championships
November 1980 sports events in New Zealand